Eleanor Janega is an American medieval historian, author and broadcaster. Her scholarship focuses on gender and sexuality; apocalyptic thought; propaganda; and the urban experience, in the late mediaeval period.

Biography
She gained her undergraduate degree in History (with honours) from Loyola University Chicago, and holds an MA (with distinction) in Medieval Studies and a PhD in history, both from University College London. Her doctoral thesis was titled Jan Milíč of Kroměříž and Emperor Charles IV: Preaching, Power, and the Church of Prague.

She is a guest teacher in the London School of Economics Department of International History, and teaches a standalone online course on Medieval Gender and Sexuality.

Janega presents the Going Medieval documentary strand on the History Hit network. She co-hosts the We're Not So Different podcast with Luke Waters, and has appeared as a talking head on radio and television. She blogs at Going Medieval.

Selected publications

References

External links
Going Medieval

Living people
21st-century American historians
21st-century American non-fiction writers
21st-century American women writers
Alumni of University College London
American bloggers
Year of birth missing (living people)